Simma Soppanam is a 1984 Indian Tamil-language film, directed by P. Krishna and produced by S. S. Karuppa Sami. The film stars Sivaji Ganesan, K. R. Vijaya, Prabhu and Radha.

Plot 
The hero played by Shivaji Ganesan is a staunch communist hotshot labour lawyer who brings corrupt evil industrialist to their knees. He spends his time organizing union activities.

He, however, gets betrayed by his number 2, played by Major Sundarajan who wants the position and power to be his own. He also loses is hand in the process, becomes disillusioned and quits fighting for them. His son, played by Prabhu, also a lawyer gives the romantic angle. Incidentally, both father and son are pulled back by the atrocities committed by the industrialists on the laborer's eventually killing them.

Cast 
Sivaji Ganesan
K. R. Vijaya
Prabhu
Radha
M. N. Nambiar
Radha Ravi
Saritha
Major Sundarrajan
V. K. Ramasamy
Loose Mohan
V. S. Raghavan
Manorama

Soundtrack 
The music was composed by K. V. Mahadevan.

References

External links 
 

1980s Tamil-language films
1984 films
Films scored by K. V. Mahadevan